Trichromia pandera is a moth in the family Erebidae. It was described by William Schaus in 1896. It is found in French Guiana, Venezuela and Brazil.

References

Moths described in 1896
pandera